Wu Yansheng (Chinese: 吴彦晟; Pinyin: Wú Yànshèng; born 3 May 1984 in Shanghai) is a Chinese football player.

Club career
Wu started his football career in 2004 when he was promoted to Chinese Super League club Inter Shanghai's first team squad. On 7 September 2005, he made his senior debut in the second leg of 2005 Chinese FA Cup quarter-finals against Shandong Luneng Taishan after first choice goalkeeper Zhang Chen got ill before the match. His Super League debut came on 5 November 2005, in the last match of the season which Inter Shanghai lost to Chongqing Lifan 3–1. Wu gained more chances after the club was relocated to Shaanxi in 2006. He became the first choice of the club in 2007 after Zhang Chen transferred to Shanghai Shenhua. He lost his position to Shen Jun when Zhu Guanghu became the manager of the club in 2010. He was dropped off in the 2011 after Zhang Lie joined Shaanxi.

Wu was signed by another Super League club Shanghai Shenxin in 2012. On 26 June 2012, he made his debut for Shanghai Shenxin in the third round of 2012 Chinese FA Cup, which Shanghai Shenxin was defeated by China League One club Shenyang Shenbei in the penalty shootout.

In March 2016, Wu transferred to China League Two side Yinchuan Helanshan.

Career statistics
Statistics accurate as of match played 13 October 2018.

References

1984 births
Living people
Chinese footballers
Footballers from Shanghai
Shanghai Shenxin F.C. players
Beijing Renhe F.C. players
Chinese Super League players
Association football goalkeepers